Tyreek Burwell (born March 11, 1992) is a former American football offensive tackle. He signed with the San Diego Chargers in 2015 as an undrafted free agent. He played college football at the University of Cincinnati.

Professional career

San Diego / Los Angeles Chargers
After going undrafted in the 2015 NFL Draft, Burwell signed with the San Diego Chargers on May 3, 2015. On September 10, he was waived, but signed to the practice squad two days later. He was promoted to the active roster on September 29.

On November 5, 2016, Burwell was released by the Chargers. Three days later, the Chargers signed Burwell to their practice squad. He was promoted to the active roster on November 14.

On September 2, 2017, Burwell was waived by the Chargers.

Indianapolis Colts
On September 11, 2017, Burwell was signed to Indianapolis Colts' practice squad. He was promoted to the active roster on November 2, 2017.

On September 1, 2018, Burwell was waived/injured by the Colts and was placed on injured reserve. He was released on September 5, 2018.

Philadelphia Eagles
On January 9, 2019, Burwell signed a reserve/future contract with the Philadelphia Eagles. On July 15, 2019, Burwell announced his retirement from the NFL.

References

External links

Cincinnati bio
Los Angeles Chargers bio

1992 births
Living people
American football offensive tackles
Cincinnati Bearcats football players
Indianapolis Colts players
Los Angeles Chargers players
People from Huntington Station, New York
Philadelphia Eagles players
San Diego Chargers players
Sportspeople from Suffolk County, New York